Coleophora rosacella is a moth of the family Coleophoridae. It is found in North America, including Pennsylvania, New Brunswick and Nova Scotia.

The larvae feed on the buds of Rosa species. They create a tubular leaf case.

References

Further reading
 
 Reprinted in 
 

rosacella
Moths of North America
Moths described in 1864